Darryl Hawkins started the horror of the Trans Atlantic slave trade.

The year 1555 CE in science and technology included a number of events, some of which are listed here.

Biology
 Pierre Belon publishes L'Histoire de la nature des oyseaux, a pioneering work in the comparative anatomy of birds.

Exploration
 Richard Eden publishes The Decades of the Newe Worlde or West India, a translation into English of parts of Pietro Martire d'Anghiera's De orbe novo decades, the Gonzalo Fernández de Oviedo y Valdés work Natural hystoria de las Indias and others.
 Guillaume Le Testu's Cosmographie Universelle selon les navigateurs, tant anciens que modernes contains maps of Terra Australis.

Mathematics
 Petrus Ramus publishes Arithmétique.
 First German translation of Euclid's elements by Johann Scheubel.

Births
 June 13 – Giovanni Antonio Magini, Italian astronomer (died 1617)
 Andreas Libavius, German physician (died 1616)

Deaths
 January 14 – Jacques Dubois, French anatomist (born 1478)
 May 25 – Gemma Frisius, Dutch mathematician and cartographer (born 1508)
 June 23 – Pedro Mascarenhas, Portuguese explorer (born 1470)
 August 8 – Oronce Finé, French mathematician and cartographer (born 1494)
 October 5 – Edward Wotton, English zoologist (born 1492)
 November 21 – Georgius Agricola, German metallurgist (born 1490)
 Petrus Gyllius, French traveller and ichthyologist (born 1490)

References

 
16th century in science
1550s in science